Munyaradzi Oliver Chawawa (born 29 December 1992) is a British-Zimbabwean actor and comedian.

Early life
Munyaradzi Oliver Chawawa was born on 29 December 1992 in Derby, England, and spent his childhood in Zimbabwe. In his youth, his family returned from Zimbabwe to Framingham Pigot, a village close to Norwich in Norfolk. He studied at Notre Dame High School in Norwich, where he was made head boy. He then went on to the University of Sheffield, earning a BSc degree in psychology in 2014.

Career
Chawawa is known for his development and portrayal of characters such as a posh drill rapper called "Unknown P" and the chef "Jonny Oliver". Chawawa has said that he "created Unknown P as a nod towards the appropriation and false ownership of black culture that often happens in western societies". His comedic influences are John Oliver, Andy Zaltzman and Sacha Baron Cohen.

His popularity grew during the COVID-19 pandemic in 2020, with the main focus being his 2019 Fire in the Booth freestyle, for the parody news sketches he created. In November 2020, Atlantic Records released his first single, "Piers Morgan", as well as a Daily Duppy on GRM Daily in December. His second single, "Pain au Chocolat" was released in August 2021. He has collaborated with the likes of comedians Mo Gilligan, Michael Dapaah and musicians Unknown T (from whom he derived Unknown P), S1mba, and KSI. In June 2022 he was announced as a contestant for the 14th series of Taskmaster, beginning in October.

Filmography

References

External links
 

Living people
Alumni of the University of Sheffield
Black British male rappers
Black British male comedians
Comedy YouTubers
English people of Zimbabwean descent
English YouTubers
Music YouTubers
Musicians from Derby
Musicians from Norfolk
People from South Norfolk (district)
1992 births